Klein Wittensee is a municipality in the district of Rendsburg-Eckernförde, in Schleswig-Holstein, Germany.

Klein Wittensee is south of the municipality of Groß Wittensee, and north of Bünsdorf.

References

Municipalities in Schleswig-Holstein
Rendsburg-Eckernförde